St. Mary's School, located in O'Neill, Nebraska is a Catholic parochial school within the Archdiocese of Omaha school system in Nebraska, United States.

Background
St. Mary's School was founded in 1900 by the Sisters of St. Francis of Penance and Christian Charity, who at the time were based in Buffalo, New York, but would soon move to Stella Niagara in nearby Lewiston, New York. During this period, the sisters were active in the Dakotas, Nebraska, and Colorado. In 1886 they went to Dakota Territory to begin mission work to the Lakota in what would later become South Dakota. They turned their attention to children, coming to O'Neill in 1900. In 1908 they were invited to teach at St. Agnes Academy in Alliance, Nebraska.

Athletics

St. Mary's athletic teams have won a total of ten state championships. The football team has won three times, in 1957, 1984, and 2002.  The volleyball team has been state champions twice, in 2013 and 2014; girls' track and field twice, in 2013 and 2014.  One-time state champions have been the boys' track and field team, in 1959; the boys' basketball team, in 2012; and the girls' basketball team, in 2015.

The One Act drama performance team won the state championship in 2019.

References

Catholic secondary schools in Nebraska
Schools in Holt County, Nebraska
Educational institutions established in 1900
Roman Catholic Archdiocese of Omaha
Private middle schools in Nebraska
Private elementary schools in Nebraska
1900 establishments in Nebraska